Ordzhonikidzevsky (masculine), Ordzhonikidzevskaya (feminine), or Ordzhonikidzevskoye (neuter) is the name of several inhabited localities in Russia:

Urban localities
Ordzhonikidzevsky (urban-type settlement), an urban-type settlement under the administrative jurisdiction of the town of Karachayevsk in the Republic of Karachay–Cherkessia

Rural localities
Ordzhonikidzevskaya, a stanitsa in Sunzhensky District of the Republic of Ingushetia
Ordzhonikidzevskoye, a selo in Ordzhonikidzevsky of the Republic of Khakassia